Graham Hitch is Emeritus Professor of Psychology at the University of York, best known for his work with Alan Baddeley in developing a Working Memory Model.

Education
He gained a Bachelor of Arts degree in Physics from the University of Cambridge, before gaining a Master of Science degree in Experimental Psychology from the University of Sussex. He then returned to Cambridge to complete his PhD in 1972.

Career and research
He has worked as a research fellow at the University of Sussex (1971–1972) and the University of Stirling (1972–1974), and as a scientist on the Medical Research Council of the Applied Psychology Unit based in Cambridge (1974–1979). He has more recently been employed as a Lecturer at the University of Manchester (1979–1990), and as a Professor at the University of Lancaster (1991–2000), before moving to the University of York in 2000.

References

Academics of the Victoria University of Manchester
Academics of the University of York
English psychologists
Memory researchers
Living people
Alumni of the University of Cambridge
Alumni of the University of Sussex
Academics of the University of Sussex
Academics of the University of Stirling
Academics of Lancaster University
Year of birth missing (living people)